The Kapudan Pasha, was the title of the Grand Admiral of the navy of the Ottoman Empire. Typically, he was based at Galata and Gallipoli during the winter and charged with annual sailings during the summer months.

The title Derya Bey was first granted during the reign of Bayezid I as an official rank within the state structure. Following the Conquest of Constantinople, Mehmet II raised Baltaoğlu Süleyman Bey to the status of sanjak bey for his efforts against the Byzantines in the Golden Horn. Baltaoğlu received the sanjak of Gallipoli (the principal Turkish naval base) and the kazas of Galata (until the Conquest a Genovese colony) and İzmit (whose tax remittance consisted of ship timber).

The success of Hayreddin Barbarossa saw the Kapudan Pasha elevated to the ranks of beylerbey and vizier in 1535, with his territories expanded into the Eyalet of the Archipelago and Algiers. Hayreddin's successors succeeded to these holdings, but saw their rank drop to two-horsetail vizier for several centuries.

The official residence of the Kapudan Pasha was in the Divankhane in the Imperial Arsenal in the Golden Horn, but he was often away as his governorship of the Eyalet of the Archipelago entailed visiting its various provinces in person every year. The post was one of great power and prestige within the Ottoman hierarchy: Evliya Çelebi reports that it had an annual income of 885,000 silver . Additional income, to the amount of 300,000  in the 18th/19th centuries, came from leasing a number of Aegean islands to tax farmers.

The heyday of the post was in the 16th century, when a succession of capable holders brought Ottoman naval power to its height, and for a time ensured its supremacy in the Mediterranean.

As a part of the Tanzimat reforms, the Eyalet of the Archipelago was reduced in rank and granted to the wali of Rhodes in 1848. The Kapudan Pashas retained their rank but were thereafter solely military servicemen.

A total of 161 captains served until 13 March 1867 when the post was abolished and replaced by ministers of the Ottoman Naval Ministry. After 1877, these were replaced by the Fleet Commanders.

See also
 List of Kapudan Pashas
 List of Fleet Commanders of the Ottoman Navy (which replaced this office)
 List of Ottoman admirals

References

Further reading
 

Ottoman titles
Military ranks of the Ottoman Empire
Government of the Ottoman Empire
 
Naval ranks